A  is an apprentice geisha in Kyoto.

The apprenticeship ranges from a few months to a year or two years, although apprentices too old to dress as  may advance to geisha despite still training.

The traditions of apprentice geisha in these areas diverge from those in Kyoto, sometimes to a considerable degree, including an apprentice's appearance and the structure of her apprenticeship.

Work
In the morning,  take lessons in the traditional arts.

Origin

Appearance

Hair

These hairstyles are then decorated with seasonal and occasional  (traditional hair ornaments).

Most , unlike geisha, use their own hair with the addition of extensions, though apprentices in different areas of Japan may also use wigs.  using their own hair have their hair restyled every week, requiring them to sleep on a special pillow known as a  – a raised wooden block with a pillow – in order to maintain it.

Kimono and outfit

When walking outside,  hold their  up either with their hands, or by tying it in place with a small cord so that it does not drag along the ground. The style of  worn by most  features long, -style sleeves, and may feature tucks sewn horizontally into the sleeves and vertically along the shoulders; this is a holdover from before WWII, when  often began their training at a young age, and would remove the tucks as they grew.

For formal occasions,  wear a black -style  featuring 5 crests to signify the  they belong to.

For formal occasions, gold brocade  are worn.

Kimono
These apprentices (sometimes known as ) may also wear a wig instead of having their own hair styled.

In media
 The Makanai: Cooking for the Maiko House, Japanese live-action television series on Netflix starting 12 January 2023

Gallery

References

External links

Types of geisha